Matei Donici (1847 – 26 September 1921) was a writer, general, and politician from Bessarabia. He was a leader of the National Moldavian Party.

See also 
 Moldavian Progressive Party

References

Bibliography 
 Ştefan Ciobanu – CULTURA ROMÂNEASCĂ ÎN BASARABIA SUB STĂPÂNIRE RUSĂ Editura Enciclopedică "Gheorghe Asachi", Chişinău, 1992, 272 pag.
 Gheorghe Bezviconi, Românismul fruntaşilor Moldovei dintre Prut şi Nistru sub stăpânirea străină, București, 1941, p. 505.

External links 
 Perioada Renaşterii ideii naţionale în Basarabia Ţaristă (1839–1899)

Romanian people of Moldovan descent
1847 births
1921 deaths
People from Orhei District
National Moldavian Party politicians
Romanian writers
Moldovan writers
Moldovan male writers